In general topology, a pretopological space is a generalization of the concept of topological space. 
A pretopological space can be defined in terms of either filters or a preclosure operator. 
The similar, but more abstract, notion of a Grothendieck pretopology is used to form a Grothendieck topology, and is covered in the article on that topic. 

Let  be a set.

A net  converges to a point  in  if  is eventually in every neighborhood of 

Conversely, let a set  be a neighborhood of  if  is not in the closure of the complement of   The set of all such neighborhoods can be shown to be a neighborhood system for a pretopology.

A pretopological space is a topological space when its closure operator is idempotent.

A map  between two pretopological spaces is continuous if it satisfies for all subsets

See also

References 

 E. Čech, Topological Spaces, John Wiley and Sons, 1966.
 D. Dikranjan and W. Tholen, Categorical Structure of Closure Operators, Kluwer Academic Publishers, 1995.
 S. MacLane, I. Moerdijk, Sheaves in Geometry and Logic, Springer Verlag, 1992.

External links 

 Recombination Spaces, Metrics, and Pretopologies B.M.R. Stadler, P.F. Stadler, M. Shpak., and G.P. Wagner. (See in particular Appendix A.)
 Closed sets and closures in Pretopology M. Dalud-Vincent, M. Brissaud, and M Lamure. 2009 .

General topology